This is a list of Wikipedia articles on companies that produce or distribute tea.

Global

 Lipton (Unilever)
 Tetley (Tata Global Beverages)
 Twinings (Associated British Foods)

Australia

 Dilmah
 Bushells and Lipton (Unilever Australasia)
 Madame Flavour
 T2 (Australian company) (Unilever Australasia)

Bangladesh

 M. M. Ispahani Limited

Brazil

 Matte Leão

Canada

 DavidsTea
 Red Rose Tea (owned by Teekanne - US and Unilever - Canada)
 Tim Hortons (owned by Restaurant Brands International)

China

 Ten Fu Group (Zhangzhou, Fujian)

France
 Betjeman & Barton
 Fauchon
 Kusmi Tea
 Ladurée
 Le Palais des Thés
 Mariage Frères

Germany

 TeaGschwendner
 Teekanne
 Teekampagne

Hong Kong

 Luk Yu

India

 Godrej Tea
 Gujarat Tea Processors & Packers Ltd (Wagh Bakri brand)
 Limtex
 Brooke Bond Taaza, Taj Mahal, Red Label and Lipton (owned by Hindustan Unilever)
 Society Tea
 Tata Tea and Tetley (owned by Tata Consumer Products)

Indonesia 

 Sariwangi
 Teh botol

Ireland

 Barry's Tea
 Bewley's
 Lyons Tea (Ireland, Unilever)

Israel

 Wissotzky Tea

Japan

 Harada Tea Processing Co., Ltd.
 Ito En

Kenya 

 Kenya Tea Development Agency
 Kericho Gold
 Ketepa

Malaysia

 BOH Tea Plantation
 Sabah Tea

Nepal

 Giribandhu Tea Estate
 Rakura tea

Netherlands

 Douwe Egberts (Pickwick)

New Zealand

 Dilmah
 Zealong

Pakistan

 Brooke Bond Brooke Bond Supreme/Red Label and Lipton (owned by Unilever)
 Tapal Tea
 Tetley (owned by Tata Global Beverages)

Rwanda 

 Rwanda Mountain Tea

Singapore 
 TWG Tea

Sri Lanka

 Akbar Tea
 Alghazaleen Tea
 Bogawantalawa (BPL Teas)
 Dilmah
 Heladiv
 George Steuart Group (Steuarts Tea, 1835 Steuart Ceylon)
 Mlesna

Turkey 
 Çaykur

United Kingdom

The UK market is dominated by five brands - PG Tips (owned by Unilever), Tetley (owned by Tata Tea Limited), Typhoo (owned by the Indian conglomerate Apeejay Surrendra Group), Twinings (owned by Associated British Foods) and Yorkshire Tea (owned by Bettys and Taylors of Harrogate). Tetley leads the market with 27% share, followed by PG Tips with about 24% share. Typhoo is in third place with about 13% share. Twinings is fourth with about 11% share and Yorkshire Tea is fifth with about 6% share.

United States

Bottled tea

 Argo Tea
 AriZona Beverage Company
 Honest Tea
 Ito En
 Lipton
 Nestea
 Snapple
 SoBe
 Sweet Leaf Tea
 Tazo
 Turkey Hill

See also

 Tea

References

External links

 
 
 

Tea